The Leader of the Opposition is an unofficial, mostly conventional and honorary title traditionally held by the leader of the largest party in the Assembly of the Republic – the Portuguese parliament – not within the government; historically, since the Carnation Revolution of 1974, these have almost always been the Socialist and the Social Democratic parties.

Currently, the Socialist Party holds a majority government. The Opposition consists of the Social Democratic Party, Enough!, Liberal Initiative, the Portuguese Communist Party, the Left Bloc, People–Animals–Nature and LIVRE.

The current Leader of the Opposition is Luís Montenegro, since 3 July 2022, after having been elected President of the Social Democratic Party on the previous 28 May.

Role
Due to its workings being based mostly on custom and convention, the Leader of the Opposition has a small official role, even though it is legally, honorifically, and nominally recognised. Law No. 40/2006, that establishes the order of precedence of public authorities in general official acts, places the Leader of the Opposition in eighth place in the list of precedences, only behind the President of the Republic, the legislative speaker, the sitting Prime Minister of Portugal, the presidents of the Supreme Court and the Constitutional Court, the presidents of the Supreme Administrative Court and the Court of Auditors, former presidents of the Republic, and sitting government ministers.

Even though the Leader of the Opposition is not entitled to a specific salary aside from the one they may have by reason of holding a public office on their own – such as that of deputy – the officeholder usually receives much more attention from the media in parliamentary sessions and activities. It is not, however, required for a Leader of the Opposition to hold the post of deputy in the Assembly of the Republic – Luís Montenegro, who currently leads the Opposition, holds no parliamentary seat

Graphical timeline (since 1976)

List of leaders of the opposition

Leaders of the opposition by time in office

References

See also
Prime Minister of Portugal
List of political parties in Portugal
Assembly of the Republic

Politics of Portugal
Portugal